The Cody complex is a Paleo-Indian culture group first identified at a bison antiquus kill site near Cody, Wyoming in 1951.  Points possessing characteristics of Cody Complex flaking have been found all across North America from Canada to as far south as Oklahoma and Texas.

The tradition is generally attributed to the North American, primarily in the High Plains portion of the American Great Plains.  The discovery of the Cody complex broadened the understanding of late Paleo-Indian cultural traditions beyond the Folsom tradition.  Most Cody complex sites were bison antiquus kill and butcher sites, and sometime campsites.

The sites are distinguished by their campsites, tools and butchering process.  The tools, dated between about 6,000 and 8,000 BC, include Cody knives and Scottsbluff and diamond-shaped Eden projectile points.

See also
 Prehistory of Colorado
 List of prehistoric sites in Colorado
 Horner site, the type site for the complex
 Jurgens Site, a kill site, campsite and residential area
 Lamb Spring, a kill site
 Olsen-Chubbuck Bison Kill Site, an example of large scale cooperative game drive system
 Plano cultures

References

Archaeology of the United States
Archaeological cultures of North America
Hunter-gatherers of the United States
Native American history of Colorado
Paleo-Indian period
Pre-Columbian cultures
Prehistoric cultures in Colorado
1951 archaeological discoveries